The 2011–12 Belgian Cup (also known as Cofidis Cup because of sponsoring purposes) is the 57th season of the main knockout football competition in Belgium. It commenced on 31 July 2011 with the first matches of Round 1 and concluded on 24 March 2012, which is exceptionally early, but was chosen to make sure all matches would be finished before the start of the UEFA Euro 2012 tournament. The winner of the competition qualifies for the play-off round of the 2012–13 UEFA Europa League.

Standard Liège were the defending champions.

Competition modus
The competition consists of ten rounds. The first seven rounds were held as single-match elimination rounds. When tied after 90 minutes in the first three rounds, penalties were taken immediately. In rounds four to seven, when tied after 90 minutes first an extra time period of 30 minutes are played, then penalties would be taken if still necessary. The quarter- and semifinals were played in a two-leg modus, where the team winning on aggregate advances. The final was played as a single match.

Teams entered the competition in different rounds, based upon their 2010–11 league affiliation. Teams from the fourth-level Promotion or lower began in Round 1. Third Division teams entered in Round 3, with Second Division teams joining in the following round. Teams from the Belgian First Division entered in Round 6.

Starting Rounds
The starting five rounds featured only teams of lower divisions and all matches were played during the summer and early autumn, mostly in July and August.

Round 1
The matches will be played on 30 and 31 July 2011.

Round 2
The matches will be played on 7 August 2011.

Round 3
The matches will be played on 14 August 2011.

Round 4
The matches were played during the weekend of 21 August 2011.

|}

Round 5
The matches took place on 28 August 2011.

|}

Final Stages

Round 6
The draw for round 6 was made on 23 August 2011, whereas the matches took place on 20 and 21 September 2011.

Notes
Note 1: Lierse, Standard and Zulte Waregem bought home advantage from their opponents as they were originally drawn away.

Round 7
The draw for round 7 was made on 23 August 2011, whereas the matches took place on 26 October 2011.

Quarterfinals
The draw for the quarter- and semifinals took place on October 28, 2011. The matches were played over two legs on 21 December 2011 (leg 1) and 18 January 2012 (leg 2).

First legs

Second legs

Semifinals
The semifinals were also two-legged.

First legs

Second legs

Final

See also
 2011–12 Belgian Pro League

References

External links
 Official site 

2011-12
2011–12 domestic association football cups
Cup